Mimi Schmir is an American television producer and screenwriter. Her most notable work has been for the medical drama Grey's Anatomy, for which she has served as producer, supervising producer and writer for over thirty episodes, and the legal drama Shark, as writer and consulting producer.

Aside from her Grey's Anatomy and Shark work, she wrote episodes for Promised Land, Party of Five and Felicity. She was also credited as executive story editor for several episodes of Felicity.

She was nominated, along with the rest of the Grey's Anatomy crew, for two Emmys in 2006 and 2007, both for "Outstanding Drama Series". Also for the Grey's Anatomy crew, she won the Writers Guild of America Award for "New Series" in 2006, and was nominated for two others in 2006 and 2007, both in the "Dramatic Series" category.

Personal life
Schmir was married to TV producer and writer Gary Glasberg, with whom she had two sons, Dash and Eli. Glasberg died in his sleep on September 28, 2016, in Los Angeles at the age of 50.

References

External links

American soap opera writers
American television producers
American women television producers
Living people
American women television writers
Writers Guild of America Award winners
Place of birth missing (living people)
Year of birth missing (living people)
Women soap opera writers
20th-century American screenwriters
21st-century American screenwriters
20th-century American women writers
21st-century American women writers